Carolina Colorado Henao (born September 7, 1987 in Caldas, Antioquia, Colombia) is an Olympic and national record-holding swimmer from Colombia. She swam for Colombia at the 2008 and 2012 Olympics.

References

1987 births
Living people
Sportspeople from Antioquia Department
Colombian female swimmers
Olympic swimmers of Colombia
Swimmers at the 2008 Summer Olympics
Swimmers at the 2012 Summer Olympics
Swimmers at the 2007 Pan American Games
Swimmers at the 2011 Pan American Games
Swimmers at the 2015 Pan American Games
Pan American Games competitors for Colombia
Central American and Caribbean Games silver medalists for Colombia
Central American and Caribbean Games bronze medalists for Colombia
Competitors at the 2006 Central American and Caribbean Games
Competitors at the 2010 Central American and Caribbean Games
Competitors at the 2014 Central American and Caribbean Games
South American Games gold medalists for Colombia
South American Games silver medalists for Colombia
South American Games bronze medalists for Colombia
South American Games medalists in swimming
Competitors at the 2006 South American Games
Competitors at the 2010 South American Games
Competitors at the 2014 South American Games
Central American and Caribbean Games medalists in swimming
21st-century Colombian women
20th-century Colombian women